Alwal National Park is a national park in the Shire of Cook on the Cape York Peninsula in Far North Queensland, Australia.

Geography 
Protected within the park is a section of the Morehead River as well as escarpments, undulating low hills, seasonal wetlands and patches of vine-thicket.  Alwal lies within the Cape York Peninsula bioregion and contains about 30 separate wetland ecosystems which cover just under 1% of the park. In the east sandstone escarpments and rocky slopes dominate the landscape.

Fauna 
Alwal National Park is home to some of last known populations of the Golden-shouldered parrot,  one of Australia's most endangered bird species. The park also protects the habitat of the threatened Cape York rock-wallaby, red goshawk and black-necked stork.

History 
Alwal National Park was officially opened in May 2010 by acting Minister for Environment Annastacia Palaszczuk.  It is named after the Golden-shouldered parrot which has the name Alwal in the Kunjen language.

The traditional owners of the land are the Uw Olkola people. The park is managed under a new model between the state government and Olkola Aboriginal Corporation Land Trust. The property was previously known as Mulkay.

Facilities
There is no vehicle access or visitor facilities.

See also

 Protected areas of Queensland

References

External links

National parks of Far North Queensland
Protected areas established in 2010
2010 establishments in Australia